Hale is a suburb and electoral ward within the Metropolitan Borough of Trafford, in Greater Manchester, England. The population of the village taken at the 2011 census was 15,315.

Located within the boundaries of the historic county of Cheshire, the earliest documented reference to Hale is in the Domesday Book of 1086, although the name of the settlement is probably as old as 7th or 8th century. The area was mostly agricultural. Hale grew in the Middle Ages to the point when Hale Barns was established as a separate settlement. Hale was formerly in Cheshire.

Hale, Bowdon and Hale Barns together are regarded as the wealthiest areas in Greater Manchester and outside of London, and similarly wealthy to Golden Triangle towns Wilmslow, Alderley Edge and Prestbury in Cheshire. These towns and the area between them contain some of the most expensive properties in the United Kingdom outside London.

History
The toponym "Hale" derives from the Old English halh, meaning a nook or shelter, as supported by the surrounding area that has natural features that provide shelter. The name Hale occurs in a number of places throughout Britain.

The oldest record of Hale is in the Domesday Book of 1086. However, what little evidence there is – in the form of etymology and a few surviving records of events in the area – points to Saxons settling the area in the 7th century. The Domesday Book records that in the reign of Edward the Confessor in the mid-11th century a Saxon thegn, Ælfward, held the manor of Hale, and after the Norman Conquest of England his lands were held by the Norman Hamon de Massey who also gained Dunham and Bowdon. The Massey family remained barons of this area until the mid-14th century, due to the extinction of the Massey line. A this time Hale was divided between the Booths of Dunham – the family that became the Earls of Stamford – and two other owners. Throughout this period the area around Hale was mainly agricultural.

Hale expanded and prospered over throughout the Middle Ages to the extent that by the middle of the 15th century a tithe barn had been established in Hale Barns – the value of the tithe taken from Hale was more than double that of any other township in the Bowdon parish. The growth of Hale resulted in the establishment of Hale Barns as a separate settlement to the east. Previously Hale Barns had merely been an isolated extension of the main settlement of Hale, but the first explicit reference to the village of Hale Barns is in documentation from 1616.

The Cheshire Midland Railway (later the Cheshire Lines Committee) opened from Altrincham to Knutsford on 22 May 1862 with a station in Hale named Peel Causeway. It was the arrival of the railway in Hale in the mid-19th century that prompted the change from an agricultural village to a commuter area for middle class merchants working in the city. The station was renamed Hale in 1902.

Governance
Between 1900 and 1974, Hale lay within the Hale Urban District of the administrative county of Cheshire. As part of local government reforms, on 1 April 1974, Hale Urban District was abolished and its territory amalgamated into the new Metropolitan Borough of Trafford of Greater Manchester.

Hale Central ward has three out of 63 seats on Trafford Borough Council, and as of the 2012 local election all three seats were held by the Conservative Party. The current councillors for Hale Central are Chris Candish, Alan Mitchell, and Patricia Young. Hale forms part of the Altrincham and Sale West Constituency and is represented in the House of Commons by the Conservative Member of Parliament; since the constituency was formed in 1997 it has been represented by Graham Brady.

Geography

Hale is southeast of Altrincham with the villages of Hale Barns and Bowdon to the east and west respectively. Hale is bounded by the River Bollin to the south and Altrincham Golf Course to the north. The local geology consists of sand and gravel deposited in the last ice age. In common with much of Cheshire, the bedrock of Hale is mainly sandstone.

Sub-districts
 Hale Barns

Demography

According to the Office for National Statistics, at the time of the United Kingdom Census 2001, Hale had a population of 15,315. The 2001 population density was 2,847 per km², with a 100 to 96.6 female-to-male ratio. Of those over 16 years old, 25.5% were single (never married) and 56.2% married. Hale's 6,198 households included 26.0% one-person, 45.8% married couples living together, 5.3% were co-habiting couples, and 5.6% single parents with their children. Of those aged 16–74, 13.7% had no academic qualifications, significantly lower than the averages of Trafford (24.7%) and England (28.9%).

In 1931, 26.4% of Hale's population was middle class compared with 14% in England and Wales, and by 1971, this had increased to 56.3% compared with 24% nationally. Parallel to this doubling of the middle classes in Hale was the decline of the working class population. In 1931, 14.9% were working class compared with 36% in England and Wales; by 1971, this had decreased to 10.6% in Hale and 26% nationwide. The rest of the population was made up of clerical workers and skilled manual workers or other miscellaneous. This shows that Hale is an affluent suburb, alongside neighbouring Bowdon. Hale was named by The Daily Telegraph as the 12th most expensive place in Britain with house prices 194% higher than those in surrounding areas and having increased by 78% since 2003.

Population change

Economy

According to the 2001 UK census, the industry of employment of residents aged 16–74 was 24.7% property and business services, 14.5% retail and wholesale, 12.1% health and social work, 10.7% manufacturing, 9.9% education, 6.3% transport and communications, 4.6% finance, 4.1% construction, 3.6% hotels and restaurants, 3.3% public administration, 0.6% agriculture, 0.6% energy and water supply, 0.1% mining, and 5.0% other. Compared with national figures, Hale had a relatively high percentage of residents working in property, and a relatively low percentage working in agriculture, public administration, and manufacturing. The census recorded the economic activity of residents aged 16–74, 1.7% students were with jobs, 4.6% students without jobs, 7.3% looking after home or family, 2.5% permanently sick or disabled, and 2.2% economically inactive for other reasons. The 1.6% unemployment rate of Hale was low compared with the national rate of 3.3%, and the proportion of people who were self-employed was significantly higher than the national average of 8.3.

Religion
At the 2001 UK census, 71.2% of Hale's residents reported themselves as being Christian, 6.9% Jewish, 3.1% Muslim, 1.2% Hindu, 0.2% Buddhist, and 0.1% Sikh. The census recorded 10.9% as having no religion, 0.1% had an alternative religion and 6.3% did not state their religion.

Christian landmarks
St. Peter's Church of England church was built in 1892 and is a fine example of late Victorian architecture. Hale Chapel was established in Hale Barns by Nonconformists in 1723 on what is now Chapel Lane. It underwent alterations around 1880. The Chapel is the earliest place of worship in either Hale or Hale Barns and is a Grade II* listed building. It also features an eighteenth-century pulpit and nineteenth-century stained glass.

Jewish landmarks
The Hale & District Hebrew Congregation was founded in 1976. Having started in a flat, the community moved to their current synagogue on Shay Lane in 1978. The move was necessary due to increasing attendance. The original Shule and Community Centre building in Hale served its members for 20 years until the community outgrew its facilities. In 2002, a rebuilding project was launched, forcing the congregation to hold its services in a tent in a neighbouring field for 16 months, until the new Hale Shule and P.J. Davis Community Centre was consecrated and opened in March 2003. A Sephardi synagogue is also undergoing construction, and is due to be open later this year or in early 2015.

Muslim landmarks
In July 2003 the former St David's Church on Grove Lane, Hale was converted it into a Mosque by the Altrincham Muslim Association. The Mosque serves the Muslim community of Hale and families who live in the outlying areas of Lymm, Mobberley, Bucklow Hill, Mere and Knutsford.

Transport

Hale is near the transport interchange in Altrincham and has regular bus services to Hale and Hale Barns. The village is also west of Manchester Airport. Hale railway station, in the centre of Hale, is on the Mid-Cheshire Line between Chester and Manchester.

Landmarks and culture
Royd House is situated on Hale Road. The house was designed by architect Edgar Wood and built for himself as his home. It is regarded as one of the most advanced examples of early-20th century domestic architecture and is referenced in a number of architectural digests. Royd House is a Grade I listed building.

Hale Library is situated in Leigh Road. The centre of Hale village has a bowling green. A crown green bowling green is attached the Bull's Head public house in Hale Barns. There are many parks, including Stamford Park named after Earl of Stamford, who lived at Dunham Massey.

See also

Listed buildings in Hale, Greater Manchester
List of people from Trafford

References

Bibliography

External links

Hale Library
Hale Synagogue
halelocal Community Directory

Areas of Greater Manchester
Unparished areas in Greater Manchester
Geography of Trafford